This article lists notable electric bicycle brands and manufacturers including electric unicycles.

Many bicycle brands do not manufacture their own product, but rather import and re-brand bikes manufactured by others, sometimes designing the bike, specifying the equipment, and providing quality control. There are also brands that have, at different times, been manufacturers as well as re-branders: a company with manufacturing capability may market models made by other (overseas) factories, while simultaneously manufacturing bicycles in-house, for example, high-end models.

 A2B Bicycles, United Kingdom
 Atala
 Basso Bikes
 Beistegui Hermanos, Spain
 Benno Bikes, United States
 BionX, Canada (defunct)
 Cytronex, United Kingdom
 ErokIT, Germany
 Mahindra GenZe, United States/India
 GeoOrbital, United States
 Gocycle, United Kingdom
 Italjet, Italy
 Powabyke, United Kingdom
 Revelo Electric, Canada
 Riese und Müller, Germany
 Sinch Bikes, New Zealand
 Specialized Bicycle Components, United States
 Superpedestrian, United States
 Tern, Taiwan
 Tidalforce Electric Bicycle, United States (defunct)
 Torpado
 Solex, France
 Wilier Triestina

See also
 List of bicycle brands and manufacturing companies
 List of bicycle part manufacturing companies

References

electric bicycle brands and manufacturers
 
Electric vehicles
Bicycle man
Cycle manufacturers